Alexander Melamid (born July 14, 1945) is a Russian-born Conceptualist and performance artist.

In his early life, he attended the Stroganov Art Institute, where he collaborated with Vitaly Komar in the Russian Sots art movement (a parallel to the Western pop art movement). Known as a cynical Social Realist, Melamid began collaborating with Komar in the late 1960s; the two emigrated together to New York City from the Soviet Union in 1977. The duo created collaborative works as "Komar and Melamid". In 2003, the two artists decided to go their separate ways. Around this time, Melamid's first-born son, Dan, introduced him to the world of hip-hop, which included his clients and close friends Whoo Kid and 50 Cent. Melamid was intrigued by hip-hop society because of its rich history and world appeal, and began to paint the hip-hop portraits that have become his first solo exhibition since splitting with Komar, on display at the Museum of Contemporary Art Detroit.

Alexander is currently working in Chelsea, NYC at his Art Healing Ministry. Recent new series of works include "Heaven and Hell" and "The Art of Plumbing."

References

Sources
 "HOLY HIP-HOP!" Museum of Contemporary Art. 20 Aug. 2008

1945 births
Artists from Moscow
Russian performance artists
American people of Russian-Jewish descent
Social realist artists
Living people
20th-century Russian painters
Russian male painters
Russian contemporary artists
American male painters
American contemporary painters
20th-century Russian male artists
Stroganov Moscow State Academy of Arts and Industry alumni